CBQI may refer to:

 CBQI (AM), a radio rebroadcaster (920 AM) licensed to Fort Norman, Northwest Territories, Canada, rebroadcasting CHAK
 CBQI-FM, a radio rebroadcaster (90.1 FM) licensed to Atikokan, Ontario, Canada, rebroadcasting CBQT-FM